is a major fictional character in the popular manga Oh My Goddess! and in the anime of the same name and is voiced by Masami Kikuchi.  His name is often abbreviated as "K1" (1 in the Japanese language is "ichi").

Description 
Keiichi was a 21-year-old student of the Nekomi Institute of Technology and a member of the NIT Motor Club. Keiichi is portrayed as a typical college student with a notable lack of experience with women. One day Keiichi accidentally dialed the Goddess Relief Office. Before he could begin to comprehend what on earth was going on, the beautiful Goddess Belldandy warped into Keiichi's dorm to grant him a wish. Convinced his older classmates are playing a prank on him as he has no luck with girls, Keiichi wishes for a girl like Belldandy to be by his side forever. Much to his surprise his wish is granted. Ever since, the two have been together. Belldandy's presence attracted a lot of attention not just in the mortal realm. Even though he may seem indecisive and very shy, when it comes to love he is very reliable.

He is a very skilled mechanic and an exceptional race driver. His abilities are somewhat glossed over in the OVA series, but are displayed to great effect in the movie. In the manga, he is bestowed the directorship of the Motor Club, which he subsequently passes on to Sora Hasegawa. At his supposed graduating from college (ch 78, he was one class shy), he started working at the repair shop Whirlwind owned by the founder of the NIT Motor Club: Chihiro Fujimi.  He picked up the one class and actually graduated many chapters later.

Keiichi has a sister, Megumi Morisato. As revealed in vol. 23 of the manga, he and his family are originally from the Kushiro subprefecture in northeastern Hokkaidō (the northern island of Japan). His father Keima is a glassblower with a natural gift for motorcycle maintenance (as well as a fear of being touched by women).  His mother Takano is an avid mah-jong player.

Personality 
Simply put, Keiichi is a nice guy. He tries to be nice to everyone, and doesn't like to see anyone hurt, or hurt anyone himself. He even tries to reason with Welsper, even while the latter is trying to kill him.

However, Keiichi isn't stupid because he thinks about doing (though sometimes he can be quite gullible), and can (and will) speak out if the situation calls for it. He is also rather intelligent; for example, once he answered a test full of complex chemical and mechanical questions in two minutes flat while the other students were struggling with more conventional problems.

Keiichi's pure and innocent personality also puts him in the middle of an unusual love relationship. While he understands he loves Belldandy (and she loves him as well), he sometimes has a difficult time expressing his feelings. However, there is no mistaking the bond between them, as he and Belldandy had passed the ultimate test of true love in the Ah! My Goddess: The Movie. Finally, he also seems to exhibit unadulterated purity in his actions; he helps out others in need, he rarely complains about setbacks, and always attempts to be truthful about any situation. However, Keiichi's 'pure' personality has recently been explained in chapter 285 of the manga. According to Hild, when Keiichi made his first contract with Belldandy, heaven placed a powerful seal on him that completely suppressed all his desires and longings for Belldandy. Faced with a situation where a goddess was now bound to a mortal, heaven placed this seal in order to maintain the 'separation' between gods and men. Urd and Belldandy (and presumably Peorth and Lind, given their rank and knowledge of the Yggdrasil system) were both aware of the seal and its direct subversion of a Class 1 Unlimited Goddess's inability to lie, and were concerned of possible repercussions should Keiichi become aware of it.

Keiichi's sense of fun influences his life in many ways. He relishes creating unusual motor vehicles when presented with a challenge, usually by one of his seniors – Tamiya, Otaki or Chihiro – and laughs like crazy during a heated motorbike race against his father.

In the manga, he can play acoustic guitar, and is a fan of singer Matthew Sweet, possibly due to his quirky upbringing (in the original Japanese, it's The Carpenters). This is shown in the Traveler arc in 18, when he befriends a Schrödinger's Whale (a being that lives in a 5-dimensional quantum state) that is attracted to a storage room artificially expanded by Skuld to infinite capacity; he teaches the friendly whale some of his songs when he (for Belldandy notes it is male) shows curiosity in CD he's playing. When riding the whale through 3D space, it starts singing Millennium Blues, then whips into 5D spacetime with Keiichi still riding it; whereas this would make some freak out, he has a great time, and they chill in the middle of the room's infinite space singing I’ve Been Waiting. Overnight, the whale learns Sweet's Missing Time by itself before it disappears (in the original Japanese, the song is Only Yesterday), and when Keiichi realises this, he learns that by giving the endangered whales a call enabling them to locate each other (5D spacetime being even more than infinite than 3D, Schrödinger's Whales rarely meet by pure dumb luck), he's inadvertently saved the species.

In the manga, Keiichi's personality was illustrated when he was able to summon one of the Valkyrie Lind's own Angels, Cool Mint. According to Lind, he was able to host the angel with the "love of goddesses" which he received due to his innocent personality. Because of the love from the three goddesses for Keiichi, he was more than capable to handle controlling the angel.

Later on, Keiichi also temporarily and involuntarily hosted the familiar/angel hybrid Blue Lance (then unnamed). She chose Keiichi as her host because he was the only person who referred to her as an "angel" and not as a “former devil". Belldandy complimented him that it was natural for him to not even notice it.

The English child voices of Keiichi and Belldandy in the last OVA episode were created by the actors using helium.

References

External links

Oh My Goddess! characters
Male characters in anime and manga
Fictional college students
Fictional Japanese people in anime and manga
Comics characters introduced in 1988
Fictional mechanics